Hatulia, officially Hatulia Administrative Post, is an administrative post in Ermera municipality, East Timor. Its seat or administrative centre is Hatolia Vila, and its population was 30,659 in the 2004 census.

References

External links 

  – information page on Ministry of State Administration site 

Administrative posts of East Timor
Ermera Municipality